The Shanghai Magnolia Stage Performance Awards, commonly known as the Magnolia Stage Awards, are presented by Shanghai Media Group, Shanghai Theater Arts Journal Publisher, Shanghai Federation of Literary and Art Circles, Shanghai Performing Company, and Shanghai Cultural Development Foundation each year. The awards recognize excellence in dramas, dance, musicals, and Chinese operas performed in the city of Shanghai, China.

Launched in 1989, the Magnolia Stage Awards ceremony has evolved into a major theatrical event in China. For most Chinese opera performers, the Magnolia Stage Award is as much coveted as the Plum Blossom Prize.

A few international artists have also won the award, including Nonso Anozie, Brad Little, Sakata Tōjūrō IV, and Arturo Brachetti.

Individual winners

Drama, musical, and dance

Peking opera

Yue opera

Kunqu

Qinqiang

Huangmei opera

Cantonese opera

Sichuan opera

Henan opera

Shanghai opera

Huai opera

Wuxi opera

Shanxi opera

Shao opera

Other genres
Ping opera: Liu Ping (1997), Zeng Zhaojuan (2004), Liu Xiurong (2007), Wang Ping (2018)
Yang opera: Xu Xiufang (1994), Wang Lingfen (1995), Li Zhengcheng (2011), Gong Lili (2016)
Wuju: Lou Qiaozhu (2009), Yang Xiayun (2013), Lou Sheng (2014), Zhu Yuanhao (2015)
Longjiang opera: Bai Shuxian (1991), Li Ruigang (1991), Li Xuefei (2000)
Pu opera: Ren Genxin (2002), Wang Qingli (2013), Kong Xiangdong (2013)
Dian opera: Zhou Weihua (1998), Yang Mao (1998), Feng Yongmei (1999)
Yong opera: Wang Jinwen (1995, 2002), Wo Xinkang (2011)
Hui opera: Li Longbin (1991), Zhang Min (1992), 
Teochew opera: Fang Zhanrong (1995), Lin Bifang (2002)
Jilin opera: Wang Guifen (1994), Ma Shijie (1994)
Su opera: Wang Fang (2014), Zhang Tangbing (2014)
Hebei bangzi: Wang Hongling (2017), Wang Yinghui (2017)
Meihu opera: Xu Aiying (1991), Li Mei (2004)
Liyuan opera: Zeng Jingping (1990), Gong Wanli (1999)
Lüju: Gao Jing (1992)
Qu opera: Mo Qi (1999)
Tea-picking opera: Liu Xianghe (2001)
Min opera: Chen Hongxiang (2004)
Huaihai opera: Wu Ling (2011)
Sixian opera: Zhang Baoying (2010)
Qin opera: Bian Xiao (2012)
Flower-drum opera: Li Junmei (2016)
Ou opera: Cai Xiaoqiu (2018)
Zhuang opera: Tang Hongyou (2018)

References

Theatre awards